Harrolds is an Australian department store chain. It trades in all Australian states and one of Australia's two self-governing territories. Harrolds retails a broad range of products across women's, men's, and children's clothing, footwear and accessories; cosmetics and fragrance; homewares; electrical; connected home; furniture; toys; books and stationery; food and confectionery; and travel goods.

See also

Department stores around the world

References

External links

1985 establishments in Australia
Australian companies established in 1985
Retail companies established in 1985
Companies based in Melbourne
Department stores of Australia
Retail companies of Australia
Family-owned companies of Australia